André du Pisani (born 15 January 1949) is a Namibian political scientist, author of several books, articles and journals, he has written several conference papers for SADC, the Namibian government and several ministries, he is a professor at the University of Namibia Department of Political Science. Du Pisani has been a professor at the university since 1998.

Education
The Windhoek native earned his bachelor's degree from Stellenbosch University in South Africa in 1971 and an honours in politics from Stellenbosch in 1972. He later earned a master's degree in politics from Stellenbosch in 1975. From 1975 to 1976, du Pisani was a research student at the London School of Economics. In 1988, he earned his Ph.D. in politics from the University of Cape Town. From 1995–96, he did post-doctoral research through the Global Security Fellows Initiative at the University of Cambridge in the United Kingdom.

Bibliography

References

1949 births
Living people
White Namibian people
Namibian political scientists
Namibian people of South African descent
People from Windhoek
Stellenbosch University alumni
Alumni of the London School of Economics
University of Cape Town alumni
Academics of the University of Cambridge
Academic staff of the University of Namibia